Brigadier Milton Fowler Gregg,  (10 April 1892 – 13 March 1978) was a Canadian military officer and a First World War recipient of the Victoria Cross, the highest award for gallantry in the face of the enemy that can be awarded to British and Commonwealth forces. In later life, he was a Member of the Canadian Parliament, cabinet minister, academic, soldier and diplomat.

Early life 
Gregg was born in 1892 in Mountain Dale, Kings County, New Brunswick, the son of Elizabeth Celia (Myles) and George Lord Gregg. During the early stages of World War I he enlisted in the Canadian Army with The Black Watch (Royal Highland Regiment) of Canada in September 1914 while still studying at Acadia University. He graduated with a Master of Arts in 1916.

Victoria Cross 
At the age of eighteen Gregg joined the 8th New Brunswick Hussars militia regiment. Gregg served during the First World War as a sergeant in the medical corps and later as an officer of The Royal Canadian Regiment. During combat on the Western Front in 1917, his actions earned him the Military Cross and in 1918 further valour added a bar to the Cross. Near Cambrai, Nord, France on 28 September 1918 his actions during the Battle of the Canal du Nord earned him the Victoria Cross. The citation for Gregg's Victoria Cross reads:

Victoria Cross stolen 
On the evening of 24 December 1978, Gregg's medal set was stolen from the Royal Canadian Regiment Museum in London, Ontario. The medal set which had been placed on permanent loan to the museum by his widow Erica Deichmann Gregg included the Victoria Cross, the Order of Canada in the grade of Officer and the Military Cross with one Bar.

Later career 

From 1934 until 1939, Gregg was the Sergeant at Arms of the House of Commons. Following the outbreak of the Second World War in September 1939, Gregg served overseas for two years with the West Nova Scotia Regiment and then commanded officer training centres at various military facilities in Canada and retired with the rank of brigadier in 1943. In 1944, Gregg was appointed the commanding officers of CANLOAN officers at Sussex Military Camp prior to their deployment to the British Army. He was later named the first honorary president of the CANLOAN Army Officers' Association, a veterans association of CANLOAN officers.

In 1944, Gregg was appointed President of the University of New Brunswick, serving in that position until 1947 when he was elected to Parliament as Liberal member for the York-Sunbury riding. Gregg served in the cabinets of Prime Ministers William Lyon Mackenzie King and Louis St. Laurent for almost 10 years as the Minister of Fisheries, Minister of Veterans Affairs, and Minister of Labour.

Defeated in the 1957 election, Gregg went on to become the United Nations representative in Iraq, the UNICEF administrator in Indonesia, and the Canadian High Commissioner in Georgetown, British Guiana. He retired in 1968. He died on 13 March 1978 and is buried at Snider Mountain Baptist Church Cemetery  in Snider Mountain, New Brunswick.

Honours 

{{center|

 Gregg was sworn into the King's Privy Council for Canada on 2 September 1947 by the Governor General of Canada FM Rt Hon Lord Alexander of Tunis on the advice of Canadian Prime Minister Rt Hon William Lyon Mackenzie King. This gave him the Honorific Title "The Honourable" and the Post Nominal Letters "PC" for Life.

Scholastic 

Honorary degrees

Legacy 
After his death, the Milton Fowler Gregg VC Memorial Trust Fund Bursary was created in his name. It is offered annually to students entering the Royal Military College of Canada Division of Graduate Studies and Research.

The Mons Box Trophy was created by then Brigadier, The Honourable Milton F. Gregg, VC, CBE, OC, MC, ED, CD. It is awarded to the platoon commander who has exhibited the highest qualities of leadership and who is therefore, the junior officer most fit to command the men who have been placed in his charge. The Mons Box, a ceremonial cigar box, was presented to then Lieutenant Gregg by the Burgomaster of Mons, Belgium in November 1918. In addition, all members of the Canadian Corps who had reached the Mons area by Armistice Day were presented with a souvenir medallion of the City of Mons. Duplicates of this medallion are affixed to the box. Brigadier Gregg presented the Mons Box to 2 RCR on 1 June 1973. It has been presented annually since then to the winning platoon commander on the first appropriate battalion function after 1 June. The winner of the Mons Box is determined by a selection committee consisting of the Commanding Officer, the Adjutant, Company Commanders and any previous winners of the Mons Box serving in 2 RCR. These previous winners are no longer eligible to compete. All Subalterns, who have spent at least eight consecutive months of the previous year as a platoon commander, are eligible for the award.
The Mons Box is displayed in the silver cabinet of the Saint Andrew's Barracks Officers' Mess in CFB Gagetown. It is placed in front of the current winner during all Mess Dinners and it contains the after dinner cigars. Each winner of the Mons Box receives a souvenir trophy.

The Brigadier Milton F. Gregg, VC, Centre for the Study of War and Society was created at the University of New Brunswick in 2006 to further Canadians' knowledge about conflict, and is devoted to excellence in the study of war as a complex social phenomenon. Marc Milner is the first Director. The centre incorporates the UNB History and UNB Military and Strategic Studies Programs.

Electoral history

References

External links 
 Canadian Encyclopedia – Milton Fowler
 Milton Fowler Gregg's digitized service file
 The Royal Canadian Regiment and The First World War – 1914–1919 – Lieut. Milton Fowler Gregg, V.C., M.C.
 Trust Fund Bursary
 
 
 Legion Magazine Article of Milton Gregg
 The Brigadier Milton F. Gregg Centre for the Study of War and Society
 The Royal Canadian Regiment
 Milton Fowler Gregg biography on DND's Directorate of History and Heritage
Generals of World War II

1892 births
1978 deaths
Acadia University alumni
Canadian military personnel of World War I
Canadian Baptists
Canadian World War I recipients of the Victoria Cross
Members of the House of Commons of Canada from New Brunswick
Liberal Party of Canada MPs
Officers of the Order of Canada
People from Kings County, New Brunswick
Canadian Commanders of the Order of the British Empire
Canadian university and college chancellors
Members of the King's Privy Council for Canada
Canadian Expeditionary Force officers
Canadian recipients of the Military Cross
High Commissioners of Canada to Guyana
UNICEF people
Canadian military personnel from New Brunswick
Canadian officials of the United Nations
Sergeants-at-Arms of the Canadian House of Commons
20th-century Baptists
Canadian Army personnel of World War II
Royal Canadian Regiment officers